Central Museum of Dinosaurs of Mongolia was a paleontological museum in Chingeltei District, Ulaanbaatar. It was dedicated to the preservation and discovery of dinosaur fossils. The museum was finished in 1974.

In August 2019 the Dinosaur Museum was merged into the Natural History Museum, which now occupies the Dinosaur Museum's former premises. The old Natural History Museum building was demolished in 2019 and a new Chinggis Khaan Museum built in its place.

References 

Museums in Mongolia
Paleontology in Mongolia
Museums established in 1974
Buildings and structures in Ulaanbaatar
Fossil museums
Dinosaur museums